Microglanis leptostriatus is a species of catfish belonging to the family Pseudopimelodidae. It appears to be entirely restricted to the middle and upper basin of the São Francisco River in Brazil.

This species is small (up to  standard length) but boldly patterned. Its most distinctive feature is a narrow, sinuous pale band running across the top of the otherwise dark head. the rest of the body is marked with pale and dark blotches, though overall it appears darker than many of its congeners as some of the light areas are mottled with darker spots.

References
 

Pseudopimelodidae
Fish of the São Francisco River basin
Fish described in 2006